Chalcorana chalconota is a species of "true frog", family Ranidae. It is endemic to Indonesia and occurs in southern Sumatra, Java, Bali, and a few smaller islands. Populations previously assigned to this species now belong to a number of other Chalcorana species, leading to the current delineation of Chalcorana chalconota with a much narrower range. This species is also known as the Schlegel's frog, brown stream frog, copper-cheeked frog, or, among with many other species, white-lipped frog.

Description
Chalcorana chalconota are relatively large frogs: adult males measure  and females  in snout–vent length. The legs are relatively short. The snout is slightly projecting. The tympanum is visible, slightly depressed. The finger tips are much enlarged. Coloration is green; the back may have black spots. Hind limbs may have crossbars. Dorsal skin is granular in females and has many fine spinules in males. Males also have conspicuously protruding humeral glands.

Habitat and conservation
It occurs in both primary and degraded forests, and it can be found in human settlements, plantations, and rubbish-filled ponds. Breeding takes place in a range of aquatic habitats: quiet side pools of forest streams, temporary forest edge ponds, irrigation channels, and ditches in paddy fields. There are no major threats to this common species. It occurs in several protected areas.

References

chalconota
Endemic fauna of Indonesia
Amphibians of Indonesia
Amphibians described in 1837
Taxa named by Hermann Schlegel